Leslie Roy Stevenson (July 31, 1915 – November 24, 1981) was a member of the Wisconsin State Assembly.

Biography
Stevenson was born on July 31, 1915, in Marinette, Wisconsin. He attended Jordan College and the University of Wisconsin–Madison. During World War II, he served with the United States Army Corps of Engineers in the European Theater of Operations United States Army. He died on November 24, 1981.

Political career
Stevenson was elected to the Assembly in 1965. Previously, he was president of the Marinette, Wisconsin City Council from 1958 to 1961. He was a Democrat.

References

External links

People from Marinette, Wisconsin
Democratic Party members of the Wisconsin State Assembly
Wisconsin city council members
Military personnel from Wisconsin
United States Army Corps of Engineers personnel
United States Army soldiers
United States Army personnel of World War II
University of Wisconsin–Madison alumni
1915 births
1981 deaths
20th-century American politicians